A by-election was held for the Dewan Rakyat seat of Permatang Pauh on 7 May following the nomination day on 25 April 2015. The seat fell vacant after member of parliament Anwar Ibrahim was disqualified from holding his seat after being found guilty of sodomy in a highly controversial trial. Anwar Ibrahim was a member of the Parti Keadilan Rakyat and leader of the opposition alliance Pakatan Rakyat. In the 2013 general election, Anwar won the seat with a majority of 11,721 votes beating Mazlan Ismail of Barisan Nasional.

The Permatang Pauh by-election was contested by 4 candidates, consisting of former opposition leader, Anwar's wife Wan Azizah Wan Ismail from PKR, UMNO's Suhaimi Sabudin, PRM's Azman Shah Othman and independent candidate Salleh Isahak. There were reports saying that PRM has denied that Azman Shah Othman is a member of their party.

Campaign 
Several issues dominate the by-election campaign, with the recently introduced GST being the main issue.

An UMNO branch in Permatang Pauh dissolved during the campaign period, citing neglect by party leadership.

Results 
Wan Azizah retained the seat for PR with a majority of just below 9 thousand votes. Mirroring the trend shown in the Rompin by-election two days before, turnout dropped by more than 10% in Permatang Pauh. The lower turnout also means while PKR's majority is lower, their share of popular vote is practically unchanged.

References 

Politics of Penang
2015 elections in Malaysia
2015 Permatang Pauh by-election
Elections in Penang